Million Pound Game (stylized as £1M Game) was an annual playoff final rugby league game that decides which Championship team will be promoted to Super League the following season.  Between 2015 and 2018, the game was played as part of The Qualifiers until the 2019 league restructure when it became the final of the top 5 playoff series. The name alludes to the higher level of funding Super League clubs receive.

History
It was proposed in 2014 and instigated in 2015, with the restructuring of the Rugby League season by the Rugby Football League.

At an RFL extraordinary general meeting in 2018, the clubs voted to scrap the Super 8s and revert to a one up one down system between Super league and the Championship as used previously. The Championship clubs voted to bring back the playoffs as a way to decide who gets promoted. A top 5 playoff system was decided to be the best format as it had previously been used between 2003 and 2007, the final being called the Championship play-off final and billed as the Million Pound Game.

Format

2003–2014: Championship Grand Final

2015–2018: The Qualifiers
At the end of the regular season, the bottom 4 teams in the Super League played the top four teams in the Championship in a league of eight. The top three teams were awarded a place in Super League whilst teams finishing fourth and fifth play each other for the final Super League place in a game called the Million Pound Game.

2019–present: Playoffs
For the 2019 season, the Super 8s were scrapped and it was decided a playoff series would be used to decide promotion to Super League. The top 5 Championship teams would compete in the playoffs with the Million Pound Game final being held at the home of the highest seeded team.

Results

Winners

See also

Championship Grand Final
League 1 Promotion Final
Championship Leaders' Shield

References

External links

Super League
Championship (rugby league)
Rugby league club matches